The Neobisioidea are a superfamily of pseudoscorpions.  The superfamily contains seven families:

Bochicidae
Gymnobisiidae
Hyidae
Ideoroncidae 
Neobisiidae
Parahyidae
Syariniidae
Vachoniidae

References

 
Arachnid superfamilies